

Buildings and structures

Buildings
 1270 – Rebuilding of church of San Francesco de' Ferri in Pisa, Italy completed.
 c.1270 – Rebuilding of Old Synagogue (Erfurt) in Thuringia.
 1272
 April 13 – Rebuilding of Narbonne Cathedral, in France, in Gothique Méridional style begins.
 Construction of Leaning Tower of Pisa resumes, after almost a century, under Giovanni di Simone, continuing through the decade.
 Construction of Monnow Bridge at Monmouth in Wales begins (traditional date).
 1273
 Rebuilding of Regensburg Cathedral begins.
 Palazzo Mozzi, an early Renaissance palace in Florence, Italy, is completed (begun in 1260).
 1274 – Rebuilding of Coutances Cathedral, in France, in its current aspect is completed (begun in 1210).
 1275 – Rebuilding of Reims Cathedral, in France, is completed (begun in 1211).
 1276 – Consecration of Altenberger Dom choir.
 1277
 Hailes Abbey near Winchcombe, Gloucestershire, England, rebuilt.
 St. Augustine's Monastery (Erfurt), Germany begun.
 Construction of Arezzo Cathedral begins.
 1279
 White Dagoba (白塔), Dadu, located in the later Miaoying Temple (妙应寺) of Beijing, China, is completed (begun in 1271).
 Ince Minaret Medrese at Konya in Turkey, completed.

Births

Deaths

References

Architecture